The Rep was a weekly entertainment guide, in tabloid format, published by The Arizona Republic from 1997 to 2006. It was replaced by a similar section simply named Calendar.

Mass media in Phoenix, Arizona
Gannett publications
Defunct newspapers published in Arizona
Defunct weekly newspapers
Publications established in 1997
Publications disestablished in 2006
1997 establishments in Arizona
2006 disestablishments in Arizona
Newspaper supplements